The Deputy Chief Minister of Bihar is the seniormost cabinet member of the state government who serves as the de facto second head of the state. He is the second highest ranking executive authority of the state's council of ministers. The current Deputy Chief of Bihar is Tejashwi Yadav, serving in office since 10 August 2022.

Deputy Premiers of Bihar 
Keys:

Deputy Chief Ministers of Bihar

See also
 Bihar
 Bihar Legislative Assembly

References

 
Bihar
Lists of government ministers of Bihar